Fort Meade Middle-High School or FMMSHS is a combined middle school and high school located in Fort Meade, Florida in Polk County, Florida. The school serves the city of Fort Meade and surrounding areas. The school is located on the northeast side of the city of Fort Meade at 700 Edgewood Drive North. The school enforces a dress code. The school's teams compete as the Miners.

Notable alumni
Melony Bell, politician 
Onterio McCalebb, former Auburn University running back and current cornerback for the Cincinnati Bengals
Andrew McCutchen, current outfielder for the Milwaukee Brewers, 2013 National League MVP

Sammy Green 
Former football player
Former All American linebacker at the University of Florida 
Former pro football player with the Seattle Seahawks and Houston Oilers

See also 
 Polk County, Florida
 Polk County Public Schools

References

External links 
Fort Meade Middle-High School

High schools in Polk County, Florida
Public high schools in Florida
Public middle schools in Florida
Fort Meade, Florida